Leonard Brodbeck Swormstedt (October 6, 1878 – July 19, 1964) was a starting pitcher in Major League Baseball who played between  and  for the Cincinnati Reds (1901–1902) and Boston Americans (1906). Swormstedt batted and threw right-handed. He was born in Cincinnati, Ohio.

In a three-season career, Swormstedt posted a 3–4 record with 22 strikeouts a 2.22 ERA in eight appearances, including seven complete games, 10 walks, 58 hits allowed, and 65.0 innings of work.

Swormstedt died at the age of 85 in Salem, Massachusetts.

External links

Retrosheet

Boston Americans players
Cincinnati Reds players
Major League Baseball pitchers
Baseball players from Cincinnati
1878 births
1964 deaths
Albany Senators players
Minneapolis Millers (baseball) players
Milwaukee Creams players
Louisville Colonels (minor league) players
Colorado Springs Millionaires players
Pueblo Indians players
Troy Trojans (minor league) players
Lynn Shoemakers players
Haverhill Hustlers players
Lynn Leonardites players
Worcester Busters players
New Bedford Whalers (baseball) players
Meriden Hopes players